Cirrolygris is a monotypic moth genus in the family Geometridae first described by Warren in 1895. Its only species, Cirrolygris momaria, was first described by Snellen in 1874. It is found in Colombia.

References

Larentiinae
Monotypic moth genera